Carlton is an unincorporated community located in Hamilton County in Central Texas. It lies in the northeastern part of the county and has an estimated population of 70.

History
Carlton was founded in 1877 by a man named H.H. Armstrong on land owned by two local settlers; rancher J. M. Evans and Dr. F. M. Carlton, the town's namesake.  With growth stimulated by its location on the major area stagecoach line, Carlton prospered through the late 1870s and by 1878 possessed its own school and several churches. In 1879, the post office at nearby Honey Creek was moved to Carlton and renamed for its new location. In 1900 the community had a reported population of just over 160 and several business, including a large cotton gin. The Stephenville North and South Texas Railway part of the historic Cotton Belt Route was built through Carlton in 1907 on its way from nearby Alexander to Hamilton. Carlton reached its peak population of 750 residents by 1910. During this time, two small weekly newspapers had served the area;  the Courier, which ran from 1907 to 1909, and the Citizen, which ran 1910-1936.

Prosperity came to an end in the 1930s, however. Effects of the boll weevil blight of the 1920s and the Great Depression had dire effect on Carlton. The railroad was abandoned in 1934, and by 1940 the population had fallen to 400. The declining population led to the closing of the Carlton schools in 1969 and by 1980 the reported population had dropped to seventy, a figure it maintained through to the 2000 Census.

Education
Carlton is served by the Hico Independent School District.

Miscellaneous
Portions of Carlton's ZIP code: 76436 extend into neighboring areas of Comanche and Erath Counties in Central Texas. Carlton has one large historic town cemetery located on the north side of Fm-2823 going from Carlton west towards the Comanche County line.

References 

 Stephenville North & South Texas Railroad

  

Unincorporated communities in Texas
Unincorporated communities in Hamilton County, Texas